Henry Plumer McIlhenny (October 7, 1910 – May 11, 1986) was an American connoisseur of art and antiques, world traveler, socialite, philanthropist, curator and chairman of the Philadelphia Museum of Art.

Early life and art collections 
During his years at Harvard, from which he was graduated magna cum laude with a degree in Fine Arts in 1933, Paul J. Sachs also influenced his future collecting.

During World War II, he served in the United States Naval Reserve, with one and a half years on the USS Bunker Hill in the Pacific theater. He was photographed in his uniform by George Platt Lynes.

His passion for art and collecting was inculcated by his parents, Frances Galbraith (Plumer) and John Dexter McIlhenny, who also played an active role in the Philadelphia Museum of Art. He was involved with the museum for a half century was legendary, and served it as a curator from 1939 to 1964 and chairman of the board in 1976. His older sister Bernice McIlhenny Wintersteen was president of the museum in the 1960s.

His collections of French masterpieces, 18th and 19th century silver, furniture and other decorative arts were housed in both his Rittenhouse Square townhouse and at Glenveagh Castle, his country house in Ireland. Many acquisitions were made through his interior designers Denning & Fourcade of New York City and Paris. Andy Warhol claimed that McIlhenny was "the only person in Philadelphia with glamour," a sentiment echoed by the Philadelphia Art Alliance, which dubbed him the "first gentleman of Philadelphia."

Glenveagh Castle 
McIlhenny was the last private owner of the Glenveagh Estate, which covers a large, remote region of County Donegal, part of the Province of Ulster in Ireland. He bought the 170 square kilometre estate in 1938, having rented during the summers since 1933, and used it regularly as a part-time residence until 1982. Henry made a gift of Glenveagh Castle and gardens to the Irish State in 1979, while retaining the right to live there for his lifetime. He had previously sold the bulk of the estate lands to the Irish state in 1974–75, to enable the creation of Glenveagh National Park.

Estate and legacy 
McIlhenny left his entire estate to the Philadelphia Museum of Art.  In terms of quality, [his] collection can compare with the gifts and bequests made in recent years by Mr. and Mrs. Charles W. Wrightsman to the Metropolitan Museum of Art, by Mr. and Mrs. Paul Mellon to the National Gallery and elsewhere, and by Nelson A. Rockefeller and James Thrall Soby to the Museum of Modern Art.

The items not retained for the museum's collection were sold at a two-day sale held by Christie's. Prior to the sale, which brought $3.7 million, 200 guests gathered at Christie's for a benefit dinner in McIlhenny's honor. The proceeds from the auction went into a museum acquisition fund.  McIlhenny is buried in West Laurel Hill Cemetery, Bala Cynwyd, Pennsylvania.

McIlhenny's ancestors lived near Milford, a village in the north of County Donegal, Ireland. This is most likely the reason he was originally drawn to the area and vacationed at Glenveagh.

References

External links
 Biography-West Laurel Hill Cemetery web site

American art collectors
American philanthropists
American socialites
People from Philadelphia
United States Navy sailors
1910 births
1986 deaths
Harvard University alumni
People associated with the Philadelphia Museum of Art